Carl Ludovico Stabel (1912 – 1988) was a Norwegian civil servant and judge.

After the Second World War he worked as a secretary in the Norwegian Ministry of Justice and the Police. He was promoted to assistant secretary, and in 1956 to deputy under-secretary of state. From 1963 to his retirement in 1982 he was a Supreme Court Justice.

He was decorated as a Commander of the Royal Norwegian Order of St. Olav. He was a brother of Fredrik Stabel, and together with Karen Andrea Elisabeth Eide (1914–2001) he had the daughter Ingse Stabel, Supreme Court Justice.

References

1912 births
1988 deaths
Judges from Oslo
Supreme Court of Norway justices